National policy statements are prepared by the New Zealand government as outlined in the Resource Management Act (RMA), an important Act of Parliament to ensure sustainable use of resources.

National policy statements are covered by Sections 45-55 of the RMA.

Lack of national policy statements has often been given as one of the drawbacks of the ability of the RMA to afford protection of the environment.

See also
Resource consent
Environment of New Zealand

References

External links
Ministry for the Environment - National policy statements page
rmaguide.org.nz - National policy statements

Environmental policy in New Zealand